Alma Leonor Beltran (August 22, 1919 – June 9, 2007) was a Mexican-American film, stage and television actress. She appeared in 82 films between 1945 and 2002. In addition to her film roles, Beltran played over 80 roles in film and television, often in smaller roles, always as Mexican women, and then later in her career, as matriarch types. She is best known as Mrs. Fuentes, mother of Julio Fuentes, on the NBC-TV series Sanford and Son.

Death
Beltran died in Northridge, California, on June 9, 2007, aged 87, due to natural causes. She was interred at Forest Lawn Memorial Park in Los Angeles, California.

Filmography

References

External links

1919 births
2007 deaths
People from Cananea
American film actresses
American television actresses
Mexican film actresses
Mexican television actresses
Lee Strasberg Theatre and Film Institute alumni
Burials at Forest Lawn Memorial Park (Hollywood Hills)
20th-century American actresses
21st-century American actresses
20th-century Mexican actresses
21st-century Mexican actresses
California Republicans
Mexican emigrants to the United States
People with acquired American citizenship
Actresses from Sonora